Servando Cano Rodríguez (13 September 1942 – 8 February 2021) was a Mexican singer-songwriter, producer, and impresario.

Biography
In 1988, Rodríguez was aided to organize concerts and tours by Oscar Flores, creator of artistic agency Representaciones Artisticas Apodaca. The pair then worked together to help organize concerts for Bronco and Vargas de Tecalitlán. On 11 April 1992, Rodríguez organized an event in Naucalpan for Bronco, Sonora Santanera, Los Yonic's, and Los Barón de Apodaca. In 1996, Rodríguez severed his ties with Flores.

Servando Cano Rodríguez died in Monterrey on 8 February 2021 at the age of 78.

References

1942 births
2021 deaths
Mexican singers
Mexican songwriters
Musicians from Nuevo León